Lila Deneken whose birth name is Lila Pura Deneken Cacharro is a Mexican singer, songwriter, entertainer, painter and entrepreneur. Because of her emotional singing style and voice, she is considered to be the number one female singer and entertainer in Mexico; thus, earning her the name of "La Numero Uno" (the number one).

History

Early life and career
Born in Mexico City, she was raised with her two sisters, Gilda and Guadalupe (Lupita). Her singing career began in 1966 as part of the group called "Los Peg", whose other members included José José (bass player) and her sister Gilda Deneken (vocalist). Los Peg were known for interpreting Jazz and Bossa Nova music styles. These styles would become her trademark in music.  After incorporating other music genres, such as Soul, Music Rock, Ballads, she embarked on her first international tour along with her sister Gilda. Touring under the name "Las Deneken" the 3-month tour turned into a full year due to their great success. Upon her return to Mexico, in 1972 she joined the musical group "Tabasco" with her other sister Lupita Deneken and for the first time the three sisters sang together.

"Tabasco" was discovered by Tony De Marco who became the group's manager. Tabasco's first tour was across the United States of America. Due to the group's success, the U.S. tour was extended for several years. It was during this time that Lila decided to separate from the group to become a solo artist.

Career as a solo artist
In 1978 she competed in the OTI Festival winning 2nd place with the song "Cuando Pienso en Ti" (When I Think about You) written by Nacho Mendez and 1st place for the best interpreter of the OTI festival. During the 1978 OTI, she was named "Premio a la Revelacion" (The Revelation of the OTI). In 1980, Lila entered the OTI once more. Lila is well known for her fashion sense, this time she wore a spectacular gown designed by Bob Mackie. Her performance, her presentation, her personality, and her voice garnered her once more "The Revelation of the OTI." She won second place for interpreting "Se solicita una aventura" (Looking for Romance) written by Roberto Cantoral. 

Later, Lila gained fame for a song written by Bebu Silvetti and Lolita de la Colina, entitled "Por Cobardia" (Because I'm a Coward); "Por Cobardia" put her on the top of every playlist.

In 1981 she embarked on a second International tour as a solo artist.  She became the first and only female Latin artist to perform in the world recognized "Sporting Club" of Monaco in Monte-Carlo.  Upon her return to Mexico she continued to perform in sold-out concerts with her Las Vegas style shows.

Lila has appeared with many Mexican entertainers such as Gualberto Castro.

Personal life
Married to the Televisa producer Humberto Navarro La Carabina de Ambrosio (later divorced), she had two children with Navarro, Lila decided to focus on her family. She left entertaining and began painting and writing musicals, plays and short stories.

Return to show business
In 2001, she returned to performing with 4 concerts in the "Foro Cultural Coyoacanense Hugo Arguelles", where she debuted a newer style as music along with her standards.

In October 2001 she successfully four-walled the "Ramiro Jimenez" theater in Mexico City.

In 2002 she was named "Madrina de Honor" in the "Festival del Dia Mundial del Mariachi".

References

1949 births
Living people
Mexican stage actresses
Mexican women singers
Mexican people of German descent
Mexican vedettes
Singers from Mexico City